Arlie is a given name. Notable people with the name include:

Arlie F. Culp (born 1926), Republican member of the North Carolina General Assembly, USA
Arlie Russell Hochschild (born 1940), professor of sociology at the University of California, Berkeley
Arlie Latham (1860–1952), American third baseman in Major League Baseball from 1880 to 1909

Arlie Mucks (1891–1967), American track and field athlete who competed in the 1912 Summer Olympics
Arlie Neaville, American gospel singer and songwriter 
Arlie Petters (born 1964), Belizean American mathematical physicist, professor at Duke University
Arlie Pond (1873–1930), American major league baseball pitcher and doctor in the U.S. Army

Arlie Schardt (1895–1980), American athlete who competed mainly in the 3000 metre team
Arlie William Schorger (born 1884), chemical researcher and businessman who also did work in ornithology
Arlie Tarbert (1904–1946), reserve outfielder in Major League Baseball who played 1927–1928

Hypocorisms
English-language unisex given names